Arachnoides tenuis is a species of sea urchin of the family Clypeasteridae. Their armour is covered with spines. It is placed in the genus Arachnoides and lives in the sea. Arachnoides tenuis was first scientifically described in 1938 by Hubert Lyman Clark.

See also 
 Aporocidaris usarpi
 Arachnoides placenta
 Araeolampas atlantica

References 

Animals described in 1938
Clypeasteridae
Taxa named by Hubert Lyman Clark